Evgeny Korolev was the defending champion, but decided not to participate.
Pablo Cuevas defeated Igor Andreev 6–1, 6–1 to win the title.

Seeds

Draw

Finals

Top half

Bottom half

References
Main Draw
Qualifying Singles

Pekao Open - Singles
2010 Singles
2010 in Polish tennis